The Tri-State PGA Championship is a golf tournament that is the championship of the Tri-State section of the PGA of America. The Tri-State area includes all of West Virginia, the northwest corner of Maryland, and western Pennsylvania.  It has been played annually since 1931 at a variety of courses in that area.

Winners 

2022 Kevin Shields
2021 Rob McClellan
2020 John Aber
2019 Devin Gee
2018 Kevin Shields
2017 Justin Collins
2016 Roy Vucinich
2015 Kevin Shields
2014 Denny Dolci
2013 Rob McClellan
2012 Joe Boros
2011 Rob McClellan
2010 Barry G. Evans
2009 Barry G. Evans
2008 Brad Westfall
2007 Brad Westfall
2006 Bob Ford
2005 Sean Farren
2004 Sean Farren
2003 Barry G. Evans
2002 Bob Ford
2001 John Aber
2000 John Mazza
1999 Bob Ford
1998 Barry G. Evans
1997 Ed Vietmeier
1996 Ned Weaver
1995 Bob Ford
1994 Bob Ford
1993 Ed Vietmeier
1992 Harry Toscano
1991 John Aubrey
1990 Cleve Coldwater
1989 Scott Davis
1988 Roy Vucinich
1987 Dale Loeslein
1986 Ron Milanovich
1985 John Mazza
1984 Bob Ford
1983 Mike Evans
1982 Bob Ford
1981 Jim Ferree
1980 Bob Ford
1979 Mike Evans
1978 Jim Ferree
1977 Roy Vucinich
1976 Chuck Scally
1975 Chuck Scally
1974 Norm Rack
1973 Roland Stafford
1972 Roland Stafford
1971 Chuck Scally
1970 Billy Capps
1969 Chuck Scally
1968 Roland Stafford
1967 Billy Capps
1966 Joe Taylor
1965 Ed Furgol
1964 Frank Kiraly
1963 Ed Furgol
1962 Ed Furgol
1961 Lew Worsham
1960 Andy Borkovich
1959 Mike Krak
1958 Mike Krak
1957 Joby Conner
1956 Mike Pavella
1955 Carl Beljan
1954 Mike Pavella
1953 Joe Taylor
1952 Tom "Red" Blaskovich
1951 Mike Pavella
1950 Bobby Cruickshank
1949 Bobby Cruickshank
1948 Rut Coffey
1947 Dick Shoemaker
1946 Dick Shoemaker
1945 Sam Parks Jr.
1944 Monty Onoretta
1943 Sam Parks Jr.
1942 Ted Luther
1941 Perry Delvecchio
1940 Arthur Clark
1939 Dick Shoemaker
1938 Ted Luther
1937 Sam Parks Jr.
1936 Tony Joy
1935 Perry Delvecchio
1934 Perry Delvecchio
1933 Emil Loeffler
1932 Ted Luther
1931 Perry Delvecchio

External links 
PGA of America – Tri-State section
Honor Roll, Awards, & Winners

PGA of America sectional tournaments
Golf in Maryland
Golf in Pennsylvania
Golf in West Virginia
Recurring sporting events established in 1931
1931 establishments in the United States